Sir John Holbrook Osborn (14 December 1922 – 2 December 2015) was a British Conservative politician.

Osborn was educated at Rugby School and Trinity Hall, Cambridge. He was Member of Parliament for Sheffield Hallam from 1959 to 1987, preceding Irvine Patnick.  Sir John was also a Member of the European Parliament from 1975 to 1979. He was knighted in the 1983 Birthday Honours.

Osborn was interviewed in 2012 as part of The History of Parliament's oral history project.

References 

 Times Guide to the House of Commons 1983

External links 
 

1922 births
2015 deaths
People educated at Rugby School
Alumni of Trinity Hall, Cambridge
Conservative Party (UK) MPs for English constituencies
Knights Bachelor
Politicians awarded knighthoods
UK MPs 1959–1964
UK MPs 1964–1966
UK MPs 1966–1970
UK MPs 1970–1974
UK MPs 1974
UK MPs 1974–1979
UK MPs 1979–1983
UK MPs 1983–1987
Conservative Party (UK) MEPs
MEPs for the United Kingdom 1973–1979